Crinocraspeda is a monotypic moth genus in the family Lasiocampidae erected by George Hampson in 1893. Its only species, Crinocraspeda torrida, was described by Frederic Moore in 1879.

Distribution
It is found in India, Myanmar, Nepal, southern China, northern Thailand, Laos and northern Vietnam.

References

Lasiocampidae